Louis-Eugène Mouchon (30 August 1843, in Paris – 1914) was a French painter, graphic artist, medalist, engraver and sculptor. He created state papers, stamps, coins, currency and medals. He was the son and pupil of Louis Claude Mouchon, the painter. He exhibited at the Salon from 1876 onwards and became an Associate of the Artistes Francais in 1888. His most famous stamps are the Mouchon series and the Navigation & Commerce series of French postage stamps. His medals can be found in the collection of several museums.

Postage stamps 
Next to stamps for France, Mouchon also designed for Abyssinia, Argentina, Belgium (Brussels Exhibition), Greece, Guatemala, Luxemburg, Monaco, the Netherlands, Persia, Portugal and colonies, Russia and Serbia.

Medals and currency
Mouchon entered the field of medal making at the age of forty three. He was made a knight of the Legion of Honor in 1895 and won the grand prize for engraving at the Universal Exposition in Paris, 1900. He designed coins and the plates for currency for Portugal.

See also 
Jules Auguste Sage
Postage stamps and postal history of France

References

External links

The Metropolitan Museum of Art, online collection
Museu Nacional d'Art de Catalunya, Online work of Mouchon 
Musée d'Orsay, online collection
 

1843 births
1914 deaths
19th-century engravers
20th-century engravers
French engravers
French stamp designers
Recipients of the Legion of Honour
20th-century French printmakers